Dewan Md Salahuddin is a Bangladeshi politician. He is the president of Dhaka District Bangladesh Nationalist Party (BNP). He was elected member of parliament twice (1996-2001, 2001-2006) from Dhaka-12. His father Dewan Mohammad Idris was elected to parliament in 1979.

Political career
Salahuddin was elected to parliament from Dhaka-12 as a Bangladesh Nationalist Party candidate in 1996 and 2001. In January 2000, he was made a member of the parliamentary Standing Committee on Health Ministry.

Ahead of the 2008 general election, the Election Commission redrew constituency boundaries to reflect population changes revealed by the 2001 Census of Bangladesh. The constituency formerly known as Dhaka-12 became Dhaka-19. Salahuddin stood as a BNP candidate for the new seat in 2008, but was defeated by Md. Enamur Rahaman.

On 25 October 2015, Salahuddin was arrested from his residence on several charges of election-related violence. He was released on bail in March 2016. He said the charges were politically motivated.

He again stood in the 2018 general election, for Dhaka-19. He came second to the Awami League incumbent.

References

Bangladesh Nationalist Party politicians
Living people
7th Jatiya Sangsad members
8th Jatiya Sangsad members
Year of birth missing (living people)